The wrestling tournament at the 1955 Mediterranean Games was held in Barcelona, Spain.

Medalists

Greco-Roman

Medal table

References
1955 Mediterranean Games report at the International Committee of Mediterranean Games (CIJM) website
List of Olympians who won medals at the Mediterranean Games at Olympedia.org

Medi
Wrestling
1955
International wrestling competitions hosted by Spain